Farmington Municipal Schools (also known as the Farmington Municipal School District) is a public school district based in Farmington, New Mexico, United States.

The district covers an  area in central San Juan County.

In addition to Farmington, the district also serves the communities of La Plata, Lake Valley, Napi HQ, Totah Vista. It also serves most of Crouch Mesa and Lee Acres, as well as portions of Center Point, Flora Vista, North Light Plant, Spencerville.

All FMS district schools above elementary school are supplied with MacBook computers in which the teachers and students can use and take home with them.

Schools

High schools

Farmington High School
Piedra Vista High School
Rocinante High School (Alternative)
San Juan College High School (Early College) 
New Mexico Virtual Academy (Online)

Middle schools
Heights Middle School
Hermosa Middle School
Mesa View Middle School
Tibbetts Middle School

Elementary schools
Animas Elementary School
Apache Elementary School
Bluffview Elementary School
Country Club Elementary School
Esperanza Elementary School
Ladera Elementary School
McCormick Elementary School
McKinley Elementary School
Mesa Verde Elementary School
Northeast Elementary School

Other Campuses

Preschools
Farmington Preschool Academy East
Farmington Preschool Academy West

Enrollment
2013-2014 School Year: 11,651 students 
2007-2008 School Year: 10,253 students
2006-2007 School Year: 10,080 students
2005-2006 School Year: 10,254 students
2004-2005 School Year: 10,135 students
2003-2004 School Year: 10,055 students
2002-2003 School Year: 10,126 students
2001-2002 School Year: 10,215 students
2000-2001 School Year: 10,209 students

Demographics
There were a total of 10,253 students enrolled in Farmington Municipal Schools during the 2007-2008 school year. The gender makeup of the district was 48.70% female and 51.30% male. The racial makeup of the district was 43.00% White, 29.94% Native American, 24.94% Hispanic, 1.44% African American, and 0.67% Asian/Pacific Islander.

See also
List of school districts in New Mexico

References

External links
Farmington Municipal Schools – Official site.

School districts in New Mexico
Education in San Juan County, New Mexico